Michael Joseph Shapiro (born February 16, 1940) is an American educator, theorist, and writer. He is a Professor of Political Science at the University of Hawaii at Mānoa. His work is often described as "postdisciplinary," drawing from such diverse fields as political philosophy, critical theory, cultural studies, film theory, international relations theory, literary theory, African American studies, comparative politics, geography, sociology, urban planning, economics, psychoanalysis, crime fiction, genre studies, new musicology, aesthetics and indigenous politics.

As the political theorist William E. Connolly has described him: "no one writing in English today has as wide a command over diverse references or develops more profound insights from them".

Career
Shapiro's early work in political science covered the conventional areas of the discipline, including political psychology, decision theory and electoral politics.  Around 1980, however, under the influence of philosophers such as Michel Foucault, Shapiro began employing concepts from continental philosophy  and  cultural studies including governmentality, micropolitics, the movement-image, the time-image, and rhythmanalysis, while introducing unconventional devices such as first-person narrative into his essays. Shapiro's postdisciplinary political thought is the subject of a forthcoming volume from the Routledge book series "Innovators in Political Theory", which will feature a retrospective of his most important essays in a single volume.

Shapiro is the editor of a book series in political theory (with the University of Edinburgh Press) entitled Taking on the Political; previously, he was editor the journal Theory and Event from 2004 to 2009, a book series in international studies and comparative politics (with the University of Minnesota Press) entitled Borderlines. Shapiro received his Ph.D. in political science from Northwestern University in 1966, before moving on to a position as professor and chair of the University of Hawaiii at Mānoa's Political Science Department.

Shapiro has also taught at the University of California, Berkeley (1968–1970), the University of Massachusetts Amherst (1979 and 1986), the University of Bergen in Norway (1972–73), the Tisch School of the Arts at New York University (2002), and the European Graduate School in Saas-Fee, Switzerland. 
With his colleagues at the University of Hawaii at Mānoa Political Science Department, Shapiro founded what is sometimes called the Aloha School.

Bibliography
 
 
 
 
 
 
 
 
 
 
 
 
 
  Original printed in 1993.

See also
American philosophy
List of American philosophers

Notes

External links
Michael J. Shapiro Faculty Page at European Graduate School. (Biography, bibliography and video lectures)
An interview with Shapiro by Theory Talks
Book Review The Politics of Representation: writing practices in biography, photography, and policy analysis
A discussion with Michael J. Shapiro on cinema and politics by Lorenzo Rinelli on JGCinema

20th-century American philosophers
21st-century American philosophers
Continental philosophers
Philosophers from Hawaii
American political scientists
American political philosophers
American expatriates in Switzerland
Critical theorists
University of Hawaiʻi faculty
Academic staff of European Graduate School
University of Massachusetts Amherst faculty
1940 births
Living people
Tisch School of the Arts faculty
Philosophers from Massachusetts